Elwyn LaVerne Simons (July 14, 1930 – March 6, 2016) was an American paleontologist, paleozoologist, and a wildlife conservationist for primates. He was known as the father of modern primate paleontology for his discovery of some of humankind's earliest antecedents.

His paleontology field work included sites in Egypt,  Madagascar, and the U.S. state of Wyoming.

Works
He authored more than 300 scholarly books and research articles, often acting as the sole author or coauthoring with his students and colleagues. He was a member of both the National Academy of Sciences (US) and the American Philosophical Society.

See also

References

Literature cited

 

American paleontologists
Paleozoologists
1930 births
2016 deaths
American conservationists
Duke University faculty
Princeton University faculty
Yale University faculty
Princeton University alumni
Rice University alumni
People from Lawrence, Kansas
Scientists from Kansas
20th-century American zoologists
Members of the American Philosophical Society
Alumni of University College, Oxford